Big Daddy is the tenth studio album by American singer-songwriter John Mellencamp, released in 1989 by Mercury Records. It was his last album to be released under the name John Cougar Mellencamp, a combination of his real name and his original stage name of Johnny Cougar. The album peaked at number seven on the Billboard 200 and contained the singles "Pop Singer" and "Jackie Brown", which peaked at No. 15 and 48, respectively, on the Billboard Hot 100. A re-mastered version of the album was released on May 24, 2005, and contains a bonus acoustic version of "Jackie Brown". Like The Lonesome Jubilee, Big Daddy is folk-inspired as violins and fiddles (among other instruments) are significantly utilized on a number of tracks. The album's lyrics largely take a serious tone and the album as a whole is regarded by some as Mellencamp's most reflective.

In 1991, Mellencamp said: "Big Daddy was the best record I ever made. Out of my agony came a couple of really beautiful songs. You can't be 22 years old and had two dates and understand that album."

Lyrical themes

Mellencamp continues his pattern of social commentary used on The Lonesome Jubilee on a number of tracks on the album.

"Jackie Brown" addresses the issue of poverty and stimulates images of the hardships faced by those living in poverty. A lyric in the song's final verse reads "...But who gives a damn about Jackie Brown? Just another lazy man who couldn't take what was his."

"Country Gentleman" is another social commentary addressing Ronald Reagan's presidency and policies. In the song, Mellencamp continually states that it is not Reagan's interest to help the poor, but rather only his "rich friends."

"J.M.'s Question" is a broad social commentary addressing many diverse issues prevalent in the United States including the contamination of the environment and violence stemming from the constitutional right to bear arms among other issues.

"Void in My Heart" is reflective song regarding Mellencamp's position as an acclaimed singer and as one who has worked hard to make it but still he confesses: "There's a void in my heart I can't seem to fill," which is a reference to the turmoil of Mellencamp's personal life at the time, as he was going through a divorce from his second wife Vicki when he was writing songs for this album.

"Big Daddy of Them All" is the account of a parental authority figure whose selfish womanizing ways have led to his downfall, and it is an autobiographical song about Mellencamp himself. The "Big Daddy" name was derived from a character in the old Tennessee Williams play Cat On a Hot Tin Roof—one of Mellencamp's favorite plays/movies.

The single "Pop Singer," which has been widely misinterpreted, refers to living in a disposable pop world where McDonald's has infiltrated every town in America. "I just said 'singer' because that's what the hell I do," Mellencamp said on Rockline in 1989.

The album takes a less serious tone on two tracks, the first of which titled "Martha Say"—an account of a stubbornly independent woman whose ways lead Mellencamp to caution her to "look out."

"Let It All Hang Out" is the second less serious song and is a cover of a 1967 Hombres tune. Mellencamp has said that it is not really a part of the album; it was merely tacked on as a bonus track that was unlisted on the album's original packaging; however, a rarely aired video was filmed for this bonus track.

Track listing
All songs written by John Mellencamp, except where noted.
 "Big Daddy of Them All" – 3:31
 "To Live" – 3:18
 "Martha Say" – 3:41
 "Theo and Weird Henry" – 4:49
 "Jackie Brown" – 4:03
 "Pop Singer" – 2:48
 "Void in My Heart" – 2:30
 "Mansions in Heaven" – 3:06
 "Sometimes a Great Notion" – 3:33
 "Country Gentleman" – 3:17
 "J.M.'s Question" – 3:40
 "Let It All Hang Out" (B.B. Cunningham, McEwen, Master, Hunter) – 3:11
 "Jackie Brown" (acoustic version) (2005 re-issue bonus track) – 4:24

Personnel
John Mellencamp – vocals, guitar
Larry Crane – acoustic guitar, electric guitar, mandolin
Kenny Aronoff – drums, percussion, background vocals
Mike Wanchic – electric guitar, bass, dobro, background vocals
Toby Myers – bass guitar, background vocals
John Cascella – accordion, keyboards
Lisa Germano – violin
Pat Peterson – background vocals
Crystal Taliefero – background vocals, percussion

Charts

Certifications

Sources
 Official Site's Discography

References

John Mellencamp albums
1989 albums
Mercury Records albums